Siratus bessei is a species of sea snail, a marine gastropod mollusk in the family Muricidae, the murex snails or rock snails.

Description
Members of the species are mostly gonochoric and broadcast spawners. Embryos develop into planktonic trocophore larvae and later into juvenile veligers before becoming fully grown adults.

Distribution
This marine species occurs off Honduras.

References

 Houart, R. (2014). Living Muricidae of the world. Muricinae. Murex, Promurex, Haustellum, Bolinus, Vokesimurex and Siratus. Harxheim: ConchBooks. 197 pp.

External links
 Houart, R. (2000). Description of two new species of Chicoreus (Siratus) (Gastropoda, Muricidae) from Honduras and Nicaragua. Novapex. 1 (3-4): 75-82

Muricidae
Gastropods described in 2000